Beaumonts may refer to:

 J B Beaumont
 Beaumont children disappearance, an Adelaide, South Australia, incidence of 1966